Estádio do Nampula is a multi-purpose stadium in Nampula, Mozambique.  It is currently used mostly for football matches and is the home stadium of Clube Ferroviário de Nampula.  The stadium holds 4,000 people.

Nampula
Multi-purpose stadiums in Mozambique
Buildings and structures in Nampula
Buildings and structures in Nampula Province